Franca Faldini (10 February 1931 – 22 July 2016) was an Italian writer, journalist and actress.

Life and career
Born in Rome into a middle-class Jewish family, Faldini was forced to flee to Tuscany because of the Fascist racial laws. After the war, she was noticed by Ben Stahl, who pictured her in a painting called "Moment at Villa D'Este" for the magazine Esquire. She later moved to Hollywood, where she won a beauty pageant for aspiring actresses called "Miss Cheesecake", and made her film debut in Sailor Beware. 

Returning to Italy, where she was initially billed as "The Italian who comes from Hollywood", Faldini started a relationship with the popular comedian Totò, also appearing in several of his films. In 1954, they had a son, Massenzio, who died a few hours after his birth. Totò dedicated a song to her, . 

Faldini eventually started a career as a journalist and writer, co-writing with  a history of Italian cinema, and writing several books about Totò.

Filmography

References

External links 

 
 

1931 births  
2016 deaths  
Actresses from Rome
Writers from Rome
Italian expatriates in the United States
Italian women writers
Italian film actresses 
Italian stage actresses 
Burials at the Cimitero Flaminio